Orange Winter is a 2007 feature documentary by an independent Ukrainian-American filmmaker Andrei Zagdansky. The documentary deals with the fraudulent presidential election in Ukraine in November 2004 and ensuing days of mass protest, known as the Orange Revolution.

History
In the center of the film are not the political figures, but the "Maidan", literally "square" or "forum" in Ukrainian, the impromptu community of orange clad protesters. After two weeks of protests the Maidan forced authorities to cancel results of the rigged election and to set up a new election. The opposition candidate Victor Yushchenko won the run-off election and became the president of Ukraine.

While the movie chronicles the first two crucial weeks of the political chaos and civil disobedience in the country, director intertwines scenes from the streets with two opera performances Boris Godunov and La traviata staged during the same time in the City Opera House.

Another cultural reference used in the film is Ukrainian silent classic Earth (1930) by Alexander Dovzhenko which is:

Credits
 Directed and edited by Andrei Zagdansky
 Narration written by Alexander Genis
 Narrator Matthew Gurewitsch
 Original score by Alexander Goldstein
 Cameramen Vladimir Guevsky, Igor Ivanov, Pavel Kazantzev
 Produced by Andrei Zagdansky and Gleb Sinyavsky
 © 2006 AZ Films LLC.

Awards
 Special Mention Award, "Punto de Vista" International Documentary Film Festival 2007, Pamplona, (Spain)
 Jury's Choice Award, First prize, the 27th Black Maria Film & Video Festival.

Film Festival Screenings
 Artdocfest, Moscow, Russia, 2014 
 DocuDays, Kyiv, Ukraine, 2014
 "Culture Unplugged" International Online Film Festival, 2013
 Istanbul International Film Festival, Turkey, 2012
  27 Annual Black Maria Film + Video Festival, USA,  2008
 SF Doc Fest, San Francisco, USA, 2007
 "Contact" IDFF  Kyiv, Ukraine, 2007 
 Punto De Vista IDFF Of Navarra, Pamplona, Spain, 2007

See also
 Orange Revolution (film)

External links
 Orange Winter on AZ Films website
 "The Color of Dissent" by Matt Zoller Seitz, The New York Times
 "Ukraine's Winter of Discontent" by Bruce Bennett, New York Sun
 "Orange Winter" by Joe Leydon, Variety
"Orange Winter" by Rob Humanick, Slant
 

American documentary films
Documentary films about elections
Orange Revolution
Films directed by Andrei Zagdansky
Documentary films about Ukraine
2007 films
2007 documentary films
2000s English-language films
2000s American films